Jacques-Pierre Peminuit Paul was a Grand Chief of the Mi'kmaq who lived at Shubenacadie, Nova Scotia.  He was most well known for his shamanic abilities.

On 15 September 1856, Paul was confirmed as grand chief by Archbishop William Walsh at St. Mary's Basilica (Halifax), receiving a medal from Pope Pius IX and a written endorsement from the Lt. Governor, Sir John Gaspard Le Marchant.

In 1879, Paul met with the Governor General of Canada, the Marquess of Lorne, in the Red Chamber, Province House, Halifax, Nova Scotia.

See also 
List of Grand Chiefs (Mi'kmaq)
Grand Council (Mi'kmaq)

References

External links 
Photograph of Paul

People from Hants County, Nova Scotia
Indigenous leaders in Atlantic Canada
Mi'kmaq people